The 1997 Harnai earthquake occurred on February 27 at 21:08 UTC near Harnai, Pakistan, and felt throughout much of central Balochistan, with a magnitude estimated at 7.0 on the  scale. A 2016 study determined that this was a doublet earthquake, the 6.8 shock that hit 19 seconds later being a continuation of the initial main shock. The largest aftershock was an  6.4 shock that hit 22 minutes after the main shock. The earthquake was caused by the collision between the Indian Plate and the Eurasian Plate.

The mountainous villages near Quetta, the capital of Balochistan province, suffered most of the damage. Small villages in Sibi District, with mostly adobe dwellings, were completely destroyed, and the town of Harnai alone had 75 fatalities. The total number of deaths due to the earthquakes was over 100.

See also 
List of earthquakes in 1997
List of earthquakes in Pakistan
2008 Ziarat, 2013 Balochistan, and 2021 Balochistan earthquakes - other similar related events

References

Sources 

 
 
 .

External links 
 

Earthquakes in Pakistan
Harnai Earthquake, 1997
1997 in Pakistan
February 1997 events in Asia
1997 disasters in Pakistan